Aditya Vikram Sengupta (born 6 September 1983) is an Indian film director, cinematographer and graphic designer. His first film Asha Jaoar Majhe or Labour of Love, released in 2014 which premiered at the 11th Venice Days section of the Venice International Film Festival, which won him the National Award for Best Debut in India.

Early life 
Aditya Vikram Sengupta was born in Kolkata in 1983 to Sharmila Sengupta and Tridib Kumar Sengupta. He attended St. Xavier's Collegiate School and post-school, Aditya was accepted at the prestigious National Institute of Design in Paldi, Ahmedabad. After NID, he worked at Channel [V] for a number of years as a promo and creative director before turning director full-time.

Career 
His first directorial venture was the Bengali film Asha Jaoar Majhe (English: Labour of Love) premiered at the 11th Venice Days at the Venice International Film Festival on 4 September 2014, At the 62nd National Film Awards, it won the Indira Gandhi Award for Best First Film of a Director and Best Audiography.

Aditya's second film Jonaki was an international co-production between India-France and Singapore. Catherine Dussart Productions of France and Samir Sarkar's Magic Hour Films were co-producers of Jonaki. Shortly after the festival run of Jonaki, it was available for streaming on Netflix.

Once Upon a Time in Calcutta (previously titled Memories and My Mother) is Aditya's third film and his first collaboration with Turkish director of photography, Gokhan Tiryaki. Filmed in 2019, Once Upon A Time in Calcutta has been selected for 78th Venice Film Festival 2021 in the Orizzonti Competition. The film had its North American premiere at the New Directors New Films MoMA in 2022 before screening and winning awards at other festivals in the US.

According to Variety, Aditya's follow up film, Birthmark, a five country co-production between India, France, Norway, Luxembourg and Denmark, which was initially part of HAF Hong Kong Film Financing Forum, the Venice Gap Financing Market at the Venice Production Bridge and received production support from Luxembourg Film Fund and the Danish Film Institute was shelved because of reasons not disclosed by the production.

Aditya is developing three projects under his home production banner, For Films. First is Death of an Elephant based on a Bengali author Tarashankar Bandopadhyay's short story. The other two projects are Mandrake, a film on magic in Kolkata and an untitled documentary on Bollywood looked through a socio-cultural lens.

Aditya is married to Jonaki Bhattacharya, who also works with him as an Art Director on all of his projects.

Filmography

Awards and festival selections

References

External links 
 

1983 births
Living people
Bengali film cinematographers
Cinematographers from West Bengal
Bengali film directors
Film directors from Kolkata
Director whose film won the Best Debut Feature Film National Film Award